Eugene Rogers (March 23, 1917–November 23, 1993), known professionally as Smokey Rogers, was an American Western swing musician and songwriter active during the 1940s and 50s on the West Coast.

Born in McMinnville, Tennessee, Rogers joined Spade Cooley's band in the 1940s (who gave Rogers his stage name). Tex Williams, Rogers and other members of Cooley's band formed a group called The Western Caravan. Both groups featured Rogers on vocals for novelty songs.

Rogers co-wrote "Spanish Fandango" with Bob Wills, released in 1947. In 1949, he had a modest hit with "A Little Bird Told Me".  Rogers is best known for writing the ballad "Gone", first recorded by Ferlin Husky 1952.  When Husky re-recorded the song in 1956, it reached No. 1 on the country chart.  It remained there for ten weeks and crossed over to the pop chart. He also wrote "My Chickashay Gal", popularized by Roy Rogers.

From 1947–50, Eugene Rogers appeared in at least 22 of Universal Studios' "musical featurettes" with Tex Williams.  In 1950, he bought the Bostonia Ballroom in El Cajon, California near San Diego and started a daily live TV show from the facility. In 1958, he was also doing a radio show on 50,000 watt X.E.R.B. in Rosarita Beach, Mexico. He programmed both sides of a Zane Ashton (aka Bill Aken) record of 'The Wind Running Through" with the flip side being the same song in Spanish and called "El Viento." The resulting sales in Mexico gave Ashton his first gold record.

Rogers and his first wife, Madelene, had 6 children; Laura Jo, Carl, Harold, Ruth-Ann, and twin sons, Roy and Rex Rogers. Rogers and his second wife lived in Apple Valley, California for several years where he was a local radio personality and performed regularly at the Branding Iron Restaurant. He died in San Diego on November 23, 1993 at age 76.

Discography

Links
 Smokey Rogers bio - CMT

Notes

1917 births
1993 deaths
People from McMinnville, Tennessee
American country singer-songwriters
American male singer-songwriters
Singer-songwriters from Tennessee
Western swing performers
20th-century American singers
Country musicians from Tennessee
20th-century American male singers